= Norths =

Norths may refer to:

- North Melbourne Kangaroos, an Australian rules football club based in North Melbourne
- Norths Devils, an Australian rugby league football club based in Brisbane's Northern Suburbs
- North Sydney Bears, an Australian rugby league football club based in Sydney's Northern Suburbs
